David Reynolds is an American screenwriter for television and film. His credits include the Disney animated films The Emperor's New Groove and Finding Nemo.

Biography
In the early 1990s, he became a television writer. 
He made his writing debut on the late-night television series, Late Night with Conan O'Brien. Afterwards, he started to trend into film with his theatrical debut as additional story material on Mulan. After the success of Mulan, Disney gave Reynolds a 'six-year contract' deal to work for both Walt Disney Feature Animation and Pixar Animation Studios. Some later works with the "Mouse-House" included additional writing on the story for A Bug's Life, writer of the host segments on Fantasia 2000, and got his official writing debut with The Emperor's New Groove.

He went on to write with other writers on films like on Atlantis: The Lost Empire with Tab Murphy, The Jungle Book 2 with Karl Geurs and Evan Spiliotopoulos, and his most acclaimed work yet, Finding Nemo, with Andrew Stanton and Bob Peterson. He received numerous nominations and awards for Nemo, including an Academy Award nomination for Best Original Screenplay, a BAFTA nomination for Best Original Screenplay, a Hugo Award nomination for Best Dramatic Presentation, Long Form, and a Nebula Award nomination for Best Script, and won an Annie for Writing in a Feature Production. Reynolds was attached to co-write, alongside Ken Kaufman, the 2006 animated film Curious George. His name was featured in the film’s trailer but was left uncredited in the film.

His last movie credit was for working on Chimpanzee where he was a creative consultant and wrote the short film The Polar Bears in 2012. In 2007, Reynolds was slated to write a film adaptation of the book Nightmare Academy. In 2010, it was reported that he was working at Sony Pictures Animation for a feature titled Futuropolis that would've been co-written and directed by Stephan Franck. , no updates have emerged for Nightmare Academy and Futuropolis. On June 7, 2015, Reynolds and New Groove director Mark Dindal attended a conversation event for the Austin Film Festival where they shared their knowledge, secrets, and strategies.

In 2021, Reynolds was announced as screenwriter for an upcoming animated Garfield film, along with the announcement that Chris Pratt will voice the titular character. Replacing the original screenwriters, Paul A. Kaplan and Mark Torgove the film will reunite Reynolds with New Groove director Mark Dindal.

Filmography

Unrealized projects
Nightmare Academy
Futuropolis
Brooklyn Family Robinson
Where's Charlie?

Awards and nominations

References

External links
 
 Director Mark Dindal and Screenwriter David Reynolds, The Emperor's New Groove Interview
 David Reynolds on Instagram

Year of birth missing (living people)
Living people
American male screenwriters
American television writers
Animation screenwriters
Annie Award winners
American male television writers
Pixar people
Place of birth missing (living people)
Walt Disney Animation Studios people